The name Nuri has been used to name three tropical cyclones in the northwestern Pacific Ocean. The name replaced Rusa in 2004 and was contributed by Malaysia and means a parrot.

 Typhoon Nuri (2008) (T0812, 13W, Karen) – affected the Philippines, Hong Kong and China during August 2008.
 Typhoon Nuri (2014) (T1420, 20W, Paeng) – the third most intense tropical cyclone in 2014.
 Tropical Storm Nuri (2020) (T2002, 02W, Butchoy) – made landfall in the Philippines and affected Southern China.

Pacific typhoon set index articles